Fumiko Ishioka (Japanese: 石岡史子; Hepburn: Ishioka Fumiko, born 1970) is a Japanese translator.

Biography 
After finishing an MA in Development Studies at Leeds University in England in 1995, Ishioka spent two years working at the Ministry of Foreign Affairs.

In 1999 she was appointed executive director of the Tokyo Holocaust Education Resource Center. Visiting Auschwitz in 1999, Ishioka requested a loan of children's items that would convey the story of the Holocaust to other children. The museum loaned her a child's suitcase, which had a name, a birthdate and the German word, Waisenkind (orphan) written on it. Ishioka began researching the life of the owner of the suitcase, Hana Brady, and eventually found her surviving brother in Canada. The story of Brady and how her suitcase led Ishioka to Toronto became the subject of a CBC documentary.

Karen M. Levine, the producer of the documentary, turned the story into a book; it received the Bank Street College of Education Flora Stieglitz Straus Award for non-fiction and the National Jewish Book Award. The book received a nomination for the Governor General's Award and was selected as a final award candidate for the Norma Fleck award. It has been translated into over 20 languages and published around the world. In October 2006, the book won the Yad Vashem award, presented to George Brady at a ceremony in Jerusalem.

References 

1970 births
Japanese translators
Living people